Cameron Albert Simaz (born January 21, 1989) is a nationally recognized wrestler from Allegan, Michigan.  He captured the NCAA Championship in 2012 at 197 pounds for the Cornell Big Red wrestling Program. Simaz is a Competing Member of the Association of Career Wrestlers.

College career

Awards
 NCAA Champion (2012)
 All-American (2009, 2010, 2011, 2012)
 NCAA Qualifier (2009, 2010, 2011, 2012)
 EIWA Champion (2009, 2010, 2011, 2012)
 EIWA Finalist (2009, 2010, 2011, 2012)
 EIWA Tournament Coaches' Award (Most Outstanding Wrestler) (2012)
 EIWA Tournament Fletcher Award Winner (2012)
 EIWA Freshman of the Year (2009)
 Ivy League Wrestler of the Year (2011, 2012)
 Ivy League Rookie of the Year (2009)
 First-Team All-Ivy (2009, 2010, 2011, 2012)
 NWCA All-Academic Team (2010, 2011)

References

American wrestlers
Cornell Big Red wrestlers
Living people
1989 births